The program of Scouts Canada is administered through councils, (previously referred to as regions which reported to the Provincial Council, when Scouts Canada was a federated structure) with each council covering a geographic area that may vary from a census metropolitan area (CMA) in British Columbia, Alberta, and Ontario, to an entire province, the case with most councils. Councils are subdivided into areas, based on membership and ability to provide local service. Each council is managed by a Council Commissioner, Council Youth Commissioner, and Council Executive Director.

Current councils of Scouts Canada

See also
 Local councils of the Boy Scouts of America
 List of councils (Girl Scouts of the USA)

References

Scouting and Guiding in Canada
Councils
Scouting-related lists